Thomas Palmer (by 1520 – 1582), of Parham, Sussex, was an English politician.

He was the eldest son of Robert Palmer, merchant of London and Parham, Sussex.

He was a Member of Parliament (MP) for Arundel in March and October 1553, Sussex in 1554 and Guildford in 1559. He was a Justice of the Peace for Sussex from 1547 and was appointed High Sheriff of Surrey and Sussex for 1559–60.

He married twice: firstly Griselda or Bridget, the daughter of John Caryll, serjeant-at-law of Warnham, with whom he had 3 daughters and secondly Katherine, the daughter of Sir Edward Stradling of St. Donats, Glamorgan, with whom he had 1 or 2 sons.

References

1582 deaths
People from Parham, West Sussex
High Sheriffs of Sussex
High Sheriffs of Surrey
English MPs 1553 (Edward VI)
English MPs 1553 (Mary I)
English MPs 1554
English MPs 1559
Year of birth uncertain